David González (born 9 November 1986) is a former Swiss football goalkeeper.

Football career
On 5 July 2005 he was signed by FC Sion and moved on 30 September 2008 to Servette. 
Due to his leadership and impressive displays, González has become the vice-captain of Servette.

In 2013, he joined Etoile Carouge, returning to Servette in January 2016.

International career
He was with the Swiss U-19 squad which finished bottom in the qualifying group in 2005 UEFA European Under-19 Football Championship.

He also with the Swiss U-20 sides which finished bottom of the final group at 2005 FIFA World Youth Championship, as 3rd goalkeeper.

External links

1986 births
Footballers from Geneva
Swiss people of Spanish descent
Living people
Swiss men's footballers
Association football goalkeepers
Switzerland youth international footballers
Switzerland under-21 international footballers
FC Sion players
Servette FC players
Étoile Carouge FC players
Swiss Super League players
Swiss Challenge League players
Swiss Promotion League players